A court of honor (or court of honour) is an official event constituted to determine various questions of social protocol, breaches of etiquette, and other allegations of breaches of honor, or entitlement to various honors. In English the term is also an architectural term (see Cour d'Honneur).

Court of chivalry
The court of chivalry was at one time also known as a "court of honour".  In British law, the court of chivalry was a court held before the Earl Marshal and the Lord High Constable; since the abolition of the office of the Lord High Constable, it has been conducted by the Earl Marshal alone.  It was established by a statute 13 Ric. II c.2.  This court had jurisdiction to try cases concerning contracts and other matters concerning deeds and acts of war.  The court of chivalry also has jurisdiction over disputes regarding heraldry and rights to use coats of arms.  The court of chivalry is not a court of record, and as such has no power to enforce its decisions by fine or imprisonment; as such it became relatively disused.  It is not obsolete, however, and cases have been brought before the court of chivalry as recently as 1954.

Military
A court of honor can also be a military court to investigate and issue judgments concerning acts or omissions which are considered to be unbecoming to an "officer and a gentleman", but which do not rise to the level where they are considered crimes triable under military law.

Dueling
A court of honor is also the name given to a tribunal of noblemen who would decide whether a grievance over a point of honor rose to the level warranting a duel, and if so set rules for its fair conduct.

Scouting

Many Scouting organizations use the term "Court of Honor" to refer to a meeting of Patrol Leaders in the Scout troop to plan activities with their Scout Leaders.

In the Boy Scouts of America a court of honor is a formal troop ceremony usually held quarterly (and intermittently upon conferment of Eagle Scout rank) where Scouts and their families come together to receive rank advancement, merit badges, and other awards. It is also important for Scouts to participate in a court of honor because it counts towards the Second Class requirement 1a and First Class requirement 1a. It is not a regular troop meeting.

In the Scout Association of Japan a formal troop advancement ceremony is held once a year where Scouts receive rank advancement, merit badges, and other awards, and Scouts in the same school year receive the same rank advancement. It is uncommon for the Scouts' family members to attend, as it is a regular troop meeting.

In the Boy Scouts of the Philippines, a Court of Honor is a formal ceremony for conferment of the Eagle Scout rank medal on a Boy Scout.  The National Court of Honor is a unit in the organization which determines and decides on various important conferments for Scouts and Scouters.

In Scouts South Africa, a court of honor is held every four weeks, normally at the beginning of a new month. The Patrol Leaders (PLs) and a Scouter are expected to attend, they are responsible for the majority of decisions regarding troop discipline, patrol management, troop programme and such. The Troop Scouter is the only adult leader regularly attending these meetings, and has the right to veto decisions. The Troop Scouter generally only acts in an advisory role, allowing the Scouts themselves to make important decisions. The Court of Honor may invite other Scouters to hear their input.

References 

Honor
Quasi-judicial bodies